Gymnaciura is a genus of tephritid  or fruit flies in the family Tephritidae.

Species
Gymnaciura austeni (Munro, 1935)
Gymnaciura neavei (Bezzi, 1920)

References

Tephritinae
Tephritidae genera
Diptera of Africa